Thijs Frederiks, better known by his stage name Brutus, (born in Amsterdam on 23 April 1983) is a Dutch rapper originating from Diemen, Netherlands. Alongside his older brother Lange Frans and rapper-singer better known as Baas B was a founding member of D-Men and the band's manager. 

Brutus had important recordings on De Straatremixes series of three D-Men mixtapes and cooperation with other D-Men members (rappers, singers and DJs) Lange Frans, Baas B, Negativ, Yes-R, Brace, C-Ronic and also with Darryl, The Opposites and Riza. 

His big break came with the success of the single "Mijn Feestje" credited to Brutus and Negativ. It reached #28 on the Dutch Singles Chart, staying 6 weeks on the chart.

In 2006, he was featured in a release of single "Ik wacht al zo lang" credited to Lange Frans featuring Brutus and  Tim van Di-Rect (real name Tim Akkerman) and reaching #18 in the Dutch Singles Chart.

He also has solo singles "Net als jij" and "Gedachtegang" and is featured in Lange Frans' single "Flappen"

Personal life
In 2006 in partnership with his brother Lange Frans (real name Frans Christiaan Frederiks), he presented a weekly radio show at Dutch hip hop station Lijn5.
Brutus lives with his girlfriend Janneke de Ridder and they have a son named Robbe (born 26 May 2009).

Discography

Albums
2007: Gedachtegang
2009: Thijstijd

Mixtapes
(Refer to D-Men discography)

Singles

Featured in

References

External links
 

1983 births
Living people
Dutch rappers
Musicians from Amsterdam